Basque cider is an apple cider from the Basque region of Europe served at sagardotegi (cider houses). Known as Sagardoa, the cider in Basque cuisine is produced at cider houses in areas such as Astigarraga, Spain, an apple growing region. It is sold in bottles, is flat (non-carbonated), and poured from height. Salted cod omelette is a traditional dish eaten in Basque cider houses. Quince jelly and nuts are also served as well as steak.

The production of the Basque cider is similar to winemaking in many ways. Apple harvesting starts in September and October to prepare raw material for barrel fermentation. The cider is then fermented up to the middle of spring. Compared to natural winemaking, Basque cider manufacturers do not add any commercial yeast. Spontaneous fermentation is the preferred way to produce cider in the Basque region.

References